Major Divisions (or Areas) are the second level administrative divisions of Antigua and Barbuda.

Major divisions often consider of a group of towns with a core town, a group of towns with no core, or one single town. In the case of the two largest cities in the country, All Saints, which is also located in multiple parishes, and Saint John's, both each have more than one major division.

Major Divisions of Antigua and Barbuda

Locations 
Major Divisions cannot be in multiple parishes. Major Divisions are located throughout the country except for Redonda, an uninhabited dependency of Saint John Parish.

Statistics

Enumeration Districts 
Every Major Division has its own number, and, these numbers can be used to identify which Major Division an enumeration district is in, for example, all enumeration districts between 84000 and 84999 are part of the Major Division of Urlings, since Urlings' number is 84.

List 
Antigua and Barbuda has 60 Major Divisions as of 2008.

 1 Green Bay
 11 Point
 2 Cooks Hill
 3 Grays Farm
 84 Urlings
 4 Nut Grove
 83 John Hughes / Sawcolts
 5 Kentish
 70 Liberta  
 13 Lower Villa
 63 Freetown  
 33 Potters  
 81 Ebenezer / Jennings
 82 Old Road
 73 All Saints (S)                                              
 74 Bethesda
 72 Swetes
 6 Desouza Road
 53 All Saints (NE)
 34 Branns Hamlet
 42 Piggotts
 37 Bendals
 7 Browns Avenue
 60 Willikies
 52 Freemans Village
 50 Parham
 80 Bolans
 10 City Centre
 41 Barnes Hill
 14 Villa
 64 Newfields
 8 Radio Range
 17 Sutherlands Development
 15 Upper Fort Road
 90 Codrington  
 40 New Winthorpes
 85 Johnsons Point  
 75 Falmouth
 30 Cedar Grove
 61 Glanvilles
 51 Pares
 76 Rest of St. Paul
 62 Seatons
 91 Rest of Barbuda
 71 English Harbour 
 9 Michael's Mount
 36 Buckleys
 35 All Saints (NW)                                                
 12 Princess Margaret
 38 Rest of St. John
 43 Sea View Farm
 32 Clare Hall
 16 Upper Gambles
 54 Rest of St. Peter
 86 Rest of St. Mary
 44 Rest of St. George
 65 Rest of St. Philip
 31 North Coast

References                               

Subdivisions of Antigua and Barbuda